American Opportunity (formerly the Free Congress Research and Education Foundation) is a conservative think tank founded by Paul Weyrich. Based in Alexandria, Virginia, It is a 501(c)(3)research and education organization. Since 2010, the foundation has been headed by former Governor of Virginia Jim Gilmore,

Activities 
Under Weyrich, the foundation focused on cultural concerns, such as forming the "next conservatism", anti-abortion, public transportation concerns, and Fourth-generation warfare. Under Gilmore, with the aid of former Reagan-era Department of the Treasury official Gary Robbins, American Opportunity has focused on lowering taxes across the board, with the aim of completely removing all taxes on shareholder dividends and capital gains, as well as removing the inheritance tax entirely.

References

External links
 

Conservative organizations in the United States
Political and economic think tanks in the United States
New Right organizations (United States)
1977 establishments in Washington, D.C.
Organizations based in Alexandria, Virginia